KRCO-FM (95.7 MHz) is a commercial radio station in Prineville, Oregon, broadcasting to the Bend, Oregon, area.

History
The then-KLTW-FM moved from 95.1 FM to 95.7 FM on August 28, 2012.

On June 23, 2014 at 12 midnight, KLTW-FM rebranded as 95.7 My FM.

On September 8, 2016 at 12:00 pm, KLTW-FM changed their format from adult contemporary to adult hits, branded as "Bend 95.7".

On April 1, 2022, KLTW-FM changed their format from adult hits to classic country, branded as "95.7 The Ranch" under new KRCO-FM call letters.

Translators
KRCO-FM broadcasts on the following translator:

Former logo

References

External links
95.7 The Ranch official website

RCO-FM
Prineville, Oregon
Radio stations established in 1981
1981 establishments in Oregon
Country radio stations in the United States